The 2008 Virginia Democratic presidential primary took place on February 12, 2008, an election day nicknamed the "Potomac Primary" because the District of Columbia and Maryland also held Democratic primaries. The Virginia Democratic primary was an open primary, and was competitive for the first time since 1988.  Barack Obama won the primary, as he did the other Potomac contests that day.

Candidates
Six national candidates appeared on the ballot in the Virginia primary. However, all but Obama and Hillary Clinton had withdrawn prior to the primary on February 12.

Remaining
New York Senator Hillary Clinton
Illinois Senator Barack Obama

Eliminated
Former North Carolina Senator John Edwards Dropped out on January 30, 2008 
Ohio Representative Dennis Kucinich Dropped out on January 25, 2008 
New Mexico Governor Bill Richardson Dropped out on January 10, 2008
Delaware Senator Joe Biden Dropped out on January 3, 2008

Background
The prior week, Barack Obama had beaten Hillary Clinton in Nebraska (68%-32%), in Washington (68%-31%)  and in Louisiana (57%-36%)  by large margins.

The Clinton Campaign looked towards the primary in Virginia as well as those in Maryland and Washington, D.C. which were held on the same day. Though Hillary Clinton spent more resources in the Maryland Primary, she also campaigned in Virginia, particularly in Northern Virginia.

Strategy

The Barack Obama campaign divided Virginia into 4 regions in which to campaign: Northern Virginia, Richmond, Charlottesville, and the Tidewater region in the southeast.  He was expected to do well with affluent and independent voters, as well as with African-American voters, who could total 25% of the vote on primary day.

The Hillary Clinton campaign said it would focus its efforts on Prince William and Loudoun counties, especially older white professional women, and also in the unemployment plagued Southwest Virginia.

Polling

Barack Obama had a significant lead over Hillary Clinton in final polling throughout the state.

FINAL POLLING

Results

See also
Democratic Party (United States) presidential primaries, 2008
Virginia Republican primary, 2008

References

Virginia
2008 Virginia elections
2008